Charles De Bondsridder (born 13 May 1943) is a sailor from Belgium. De Bondsridder represented his country at the 1972 Summer Olympics in Kiel. De Bondsridder took 18th place in the Soling with Dirk De Bock as helmsman and Walter Haverhals as fellow crew members.

References

Living people
1943 births
Belgian male sailors (sport)
Sailors at the 1972 Summer Olympics – Soling
Olympic sailors of Belgium